Al-Shu'ala is a lower middle class district of Baghdad, Iraq. It is heavily populated and its inhabitants are working class families of limited income. There is a Shiite majority of nearly 99%.

Al-Shu'ala features a canal that stretches from the far east of the city to the west called al Mashrou'(المشروع) or "the project".

Al-Shu'ala contains 27 sectors, including Al shu'ala (الشعلة), Al rahmaniyya (الرحمانية), Al dawanim (الدوانم), Um najm (أم نجم), Al jawadain (الجوادين), Al salamiyat (السلاميات), Al sabiyat (الصابيات), Al dahna (الدهنة) and Al khateeb (الخطيب).

Shu'ala